Dărmăneşti or Dârmăneşti may refer to several places in Romania:

Dărmănești, a town in Bacău County
Dârmănești, a commune in Argeș County
Dărmănești, Dâmbovița, a commune in Dâmboviţa County
Dărmănești, Suceava, a commune in Suceava County
Dărmănești, a neighborhood of Piatra Neamț, Neamț County